Dodge and burn may refer to:

 Dodging and burning
 Dodge & Burn, a 2015 album by The Dead Weather